Erin Michelle Pitt (born September 22, 1999) is a Canadian actress, known for her trio of roles in the horror film Silent Hill: Revelation, where she played Dark Alessa, Alessa Gillespie, and the younger Sharon DaSilva. Pitt's first leading role was in the 2013 film Against the Wild as Hanna Wade. She also played the title role in the 2014 made-for-television film An American Girl: Isabelle Dances Into the Spotlight. Pitt is a voice actress and is known for her roles in the television series The 99 as Samda the Invulnerable and Evie in the television series Mike the Knight.

Life and career
Pitt was born in Hamilton, Ontario, one of six siblings. She has two sisters and three brothers. She has attended the Hamilton Academy of Performing Arts, where she studies acting, singing and dancing, and has performed with the Hamilton City Ballet.

Pitt first acted in a Paperoni toy commercial in 2008. In 2010 she has a role in the short film Rick Mercer — Canadian Action Plan. The same year she was cast in the film You Lucky Dog as the character Erin. Following this she acted in the film Camp Rock 2: The Final Jam as Junior Rocker Audrey.

Her first major film was 2012's Silent Hill: Revelation, in which she played the triple roles of Alessa Gillespie, Dark Alessa, and the younger Sharon DaSilva. Pitt appeared on the cover of Fangoria magazine that year as Dark Alessa. She then had the major starring role Hannah Wade in Against the Wild, released in 2014.

In 2014 Pitt starred as Isabelle in the Universal Picture direct-to-DVD production An American Girl: Isabelle Dances Into the Spotlight. She also had the voice role of Evie in the animated series Mike the Knight.

Filmography

Awards and nominations

References

External links

1999 births
Actresses from Hamilton, Ontario
Canadian child actresses
Canadian film actresses
Canadian television actresses
Canadian voice actresses
Living people